Nekrasovskaya is a rural locality (a village) in Mishutinskoye Rural Settlement, Vozhegodsky District, Vologda Oblast, Russia. The population was 51 as of 2002.

Geography 
Nekrasovskaya is located 60 km east of Vozhega (the district's administrative centre) by road. Lukyanovskaya is the nearest rural locality.

References 

Rural localities in Vozhegodsky District